Hypothalassia is a genus of temperate and tropical deep sea crabs that are found in both Australian and Japanese waters. It comprises two species: Hypothalassia acerba Koh & Ng, 2000, and Hypothalassia armata (De Haan, 1835), both known as the champagne crab.

References

Eriphioidea